Beta Epsilon Gamma Gamma Alpha Rho Sigma, established December 20, 1923, is the oldest Jesuit fraternity in the United States. The Beggars Fraternity of Loyola University New Orleans is the first social fraternity at a Jesuit university.

History
Gardere Moore, on
December 22, 1923, during the Christmas holidays, invited a number of Loyola students to his home to begin a fraternal organization. The new organization took the name "Beggars" in order not to be classified as a Greek letter fraternity. After the ban on fraternities was lifted, this name was transliterated into Greek. Future priest Francis L. Jannsen was Director of Student Activities at Loyola, an office now known as Dean of Men.

Contributions
The Men of Beggars have been a part of the campus since its founding as the first fraternity in 1923. Both the school's newspaper and the Student Government Association were started by the Beggars.

The flagpole in front of Biever Hall, the stained glass window in Marquette Hall and the tile mosaic on the library were all donated to the school by the fraternity and its alumni.

The Men of the Beggars host Loyola's oldest party, Beggars Blast, and Loyola's biggest party, Dark Carnival.

Membership
The Beggars Fraternity holds its membership to be exclusive by invitation, requiring unanimous approval by the entire fraternity and therefore does not operate on quotas.

See also
List of social fraternities and sororities

References

Loyola University New Orleans
Fraternities and sororities in the United States
Local fraternities and sororities
Student organizations established in 1923
1923 establishments in Louisiana